Big Brother 2020, also known as Big Brother 13 and known specifically as Big Brother 20, was the thirteenth season of the German reality television series Big Brother. The show returned after a five-year hiatus and began airing on 10 February 2020 on Sat.1 and ended after 99 days on 18 May 2020, twenty years after the first season aired. It was the first regular season and the eighth season of Big Brother in total to air on Sat.1 to date. The host was Jochen Schropp.

Like in Promi Big Brother, sixx aired a live late-night show with the name Die Late Night Show every Monday after The Decision Show. The presenters were Jochen Bendel and Melissa Khalaj, who also hosts the celebrity version of the same show. Special guests joined the presenters duo to analyzing the situation of the show, which also featured exclusive live broadcasts from the houses.

A short-minute web show titled Recap mit Aaron Troschke started on 9 February 2020 and was published every Sunday on IGTV. Aaron Troschke, as the host, commented on the events from the last week.

Cedric Beidinger was announced as the winner of the season, with Gina Beckmann as the runner-up.

Due to the COVID-19 pandemic in Germany, beginning with the sixth live show on Monday, 16 March 2020, and continuing indefinitely, all live shows aired without a studio audience to comply with the German government's quarantine protocols.

Production

Presenters
On 2 January 2020, it was announced that Jochen Schropp will be presenting The Decision Show, who he has already been hosting the celebrity version since 2014. Later on 11 January 2020, it was announced that Jochen Bendel and Melissa Khalaj, would be taking over the role of hosting the after show Die Late Night Show every Monday on sixx. On 28 January 2020, it was announced that Aaron Troschke will host every Sunday a web show titled Recap mit Aaron Troschke on IGTV.

Broadcasting

After week 10, The Decision Shows had broadcast for different durations.

Cancellation of live feed 
In the previous seasons, there were featured a 24-hour live feed, in which fans could view inside the Big Brother house at any time, but this season Sat.1 announced that there will be no a 24-hour live feed from the house.

Eye logo
On 2 January 2020, Sat.1 released a new eye logo, which was in blue and in the middle a little yellow, similar to the seventh season of celebrity version.

Theme song
The theme song of the show's intro and outro is "Follow the Leader" from the band Cosby.

House
The official pictures of the new Big Brother house were released on 7 February 2020. In this season, the house features two areas: the Glasshouse and the Blockhouse.

The Glasshouse is a futuristic area. There is 198 m2 inside, and 201 m2 outside, for a total of 399 m2. It features a well-designed chair, glass lamps, yellow lampshades and a room. Housemates can expect numerous modern life amenities, such as technical devices and supplies of food and other goods as needed. But luxury comes with a price. In the Glasshouse, the housemates are able to see the feedback from the viewers. In Glasshouse, there is a robot lady called "Temi" interact with the housemates.

The Blockhouse is a "Back to Basic" area. There is 90 m2 inside, and 175 m2 outside, for a total of 265 m2. Housemates have to work for their standard life. Housemates get everything they need to live, such as a basic food package, a simple washing machine, a poor bathroom and a kitchen. They also have to do housework. The housemates of the Blockhouse are not directly confronted with the feedback from the viewers. The house also features a functional area. In the Greenhouse, the eggs of the six chickens in the garden improve the basic food for the housemates. On Day 15, Big Brother closed the Blockhouse moving all housemates into the Glasshouse. Until Day 29, when the house reopened. On Day 78, Big Brother closed again the Blockhouse, all the housemates stayed in Glasshouse. Big Brother didn't open again the Blockhouse.

Housemates

Twists

Rate the Housemates
For the first time ever, in this season the viewers can from the Sat.1-App the housemates rate and also can write comments for them.

Usage:
 The viewers can rate each housemate with 1 - 5 stars every day.
 The housemates with the highest value receives immunity.
 The comments are regularly shown to the house, but only to the housemates that are living in the Glasshouse can read the comments.

Match arena
Like in Promi Big Brother, there is the Match Arena.

Until the second week, the housemates that are living in Blockhouse have to compete in the match and the winner decides if he/she or someone else goes to the Glasshouse.

From week four, all the housemates have to compete in the match. All housemates must win the match to gain more food. However, if they lose, they will only have what they need for the week.

Room of Truth
On Day 5, the Room of Truth was revealed to the housemates. Each week a housemate will be chosen by the viewers via social media polls to enter the room of truth. Here the selected housemate will have to face comments from the audience as well as other surprises.

Glasshouse and Blockhouse

Weekly summary
 On Day 1, during the live launch, the housemates moved in and choose which house they wanted to live in for the first week. Later in the episode, Denny won the first match, he won the power to send someone, including himself, from the Blockhouse to the Glasshouse. He chose himself. Cathleen earned the right to send someone from the Glasshouse to the Blockhouse after it was revealed she was the highest-rated housemate in the Glasshouse. After a short discussion, Tim volunteered to move.
 On Day 8, Cedric won the match and the power to choose one Blockhouse housemate to move into the Glasshouse. Cedric chose Mareike to move into the Glasshouse. It was revealed that Denny received the highest-ranking, and had the power to send one housemate to the Blockhouse. He chose himself to move.
 On Day 15, Big Brother closed the Blockhouse and all housemates stayed together at the Glasshouse until further notice.
 On Day 25, Big Brother let Pat and Tim entered Blockhouse for only one night for a secret mission. They had to clean the house without being heard by the housemates in the Glasshouse. The other housemates didn't know about it.
 On Day 29, Big Brother reopened the Blockhouse. Menowin and Romana as the two new housemates decide which three housemates they want to come with them to the Blockhouse.
 On Day 36, René won the match and the power to choose one Blockhouse housemate to move into the Glasshouse. René chose Michelle to move into the Glasshouse. It was revealed that Pat received the highest-ranking, and had the power to send one housemate to the Blockhouse. He chose Gina to move.
 On Day 43, it was revealed that Pat received the highest-ranking, and had the power to send one housemate from the Glasshouse to the Blockhouse and one housemate from the Blockhouse to the Glasshouse. From the Glasshouse choose Jade and from the Blockhouse choose Rebecca.
 On Day 50, Big Brother decided to split the two houses into boys and girls. Pat received the highest-ranking and had the power to decide which house he wants the boys to move in. He chose the boys to move into the Glasshouse and the girls move to the Blockhouse.
 On Day 57, during The Decision Shows, it was revealed that Gina was the highest-rated housemate and she had to decide in which house she wants to live, she chose the Glasshouse. Then she and Pat, as he was the second with the highest-rated housemate, they had to decide which housemates wanted to live with them.
 On Day 64, it was revealed that Gina received the highest-ranking, and had the power to send one housemate from the Glasshouse to the Blockhouse and one housemate from the Blockhouse to the Glasshouse. From the Glasshouse choose Tim and from the Blockhouse choose Denny.
 On Day 71, it was revealed that Gina received the highest-ranking, and had the power to send two housemates from the Glasshouse to the Blockhouse and two housemates from the Blockhouse to the Glasshouse. From the Glasshouse choose Michelle and Serkan and from the Blockhouse choose Pat and Vanessa. On Day 72, Serkan decided to leave the house and then Big Brother announced that Vanessa will switch from the Glasshouse to the Blockhouse.
 On Day 78, Big Brother closed again the Blockhouse. All the housemates stayed together at the Glasshouse.
 The last two weeks, Big Brother reopened the Blockhouse for the housemates to do weekly tasks, but the house was opened only for the tasks, the housemates couldn't stay there.

Match arena

House moves
The Blockhouse housemates could participate in the match. In the match, the Blockhouse housemates compete against each other. The winner of the match can decide whether he or she moves to the Glasshouse or sends the other fellow housemate.

Shopping budget

Weekly task
The Blockhouse housemates had to do a weekly task for their shopping budget.

Match task
After the fourth week, all the housemates participate in a live match in The Decision  Show for their shopping budget.
 The housemates won the match.
 The housemates lost the match.

Rating table
Ratings of housemates were revealed during the live show on Mondays. Starting from the second week, the housemate with the highest rating would receive protection from being nominated for eviction. In the fourth week, Big Brother didn't reveal the ratings each housemate received, only their rankings. In the fourteenth week, Big Brother didn't reveal the ratings each housemate received again, only the housemate that was in the first place. There was no rating in the final week.
 Housemates in the Glasshouse at the time of reveal.
 Housemates in the Blockhouse at the time of reveal.

Nominations table

Notes

 :  On Day 8, during The Decision Shows, it was revealed that Denny was the highest-rated housemate on the Glasshouse, he received a protection from this week's nomination.
 : In a double eviction night, all housemates were nominated for the second round. The one with the fewest votes was evicted.
 :  Michelle, Philipp and Cathleen had the lowest rating and were automatically against the public vote.
 :  On Day 22, during The Decision Shows, it was revealed that Rebecca was the highest-rated housemate, she received protection from this week's nomination.
 : On Day 36, during The Decision Show, the viewers were given the power to determine which housemates are nominated for the eviction. Three housemates with the fewest votes were nominated, they were Gina, René and Vanessa. The remaining housemates decide which one of them will be evicted. With nine votes to evict, René was evicted.
 :  On Day 43, during The Decision Shows, it was revealed that Pat was the highest-rated housemate from the Glasshouse, he received protection from this week's nomination.
 : The housemates had to nominate from their house where they are living.
 :  Two houses played a match against each other and the winner-house received protection from this week's nomination. The Glasshouse won with 34 points against the Blockhouse with 28 points.
 : This week only the boys can be nominated. The girls received from Big Brother protection from this week's nomination.
 : On Week 9, the two houses had to do a weekly task. As the Blockhouse won the task, they had two votes.
 : The whole 10th week, all the housemates played games to have the chance to win the Golden Final Ticket, a pass to the final, granting him/her immunity from every eviction of the series and therefore could not be nominated by the fellow housemates. The housemates played in five pairs and the five winners from the weekly games, played again in The Decision Shows in the match arena and there the first finalist will be decided. Tim, Philipp, Michelle, Denny and Rebecca won the other housemates and played again on Monday. Rebecca won the Golden Final Ticket.
 : On Week 11, the housemates played weekly tasks against the other housemates, in their house and the winner will receive protection from this week's nomination. The two winners from the weekly tasks were Philipp from the Glasshouse and Michelle from the Blockhouse. They played again on Monday in The Decision Shows. Philipp won the Match Task. In another task, the non-immuned housemates played for another advantage. Tim won and his vote counts quadruple, Pat came 2nd and his vote counts triple, Cedric came 3rd and his vote counts double.
 : All the housemates faced the public votes because of violating the rules. Rebecca had protection from this week's nomination because she had the Golden Final Ticket. At first Gina, Pat and Philipp were saved afterwards Vanessa. The final voting round was between Cedric and Tim.
 : The public voted to evict rather than to save.
 : The public voted to win rather than to save or to evict.

Ratings
 Blue-coloured boxes denote live shows.

References

External links
 

2020 German television seasons
13
Television series impacted by the COVID-19 pandemic